The School of Library and Information Studies of the University of the Philippines or UP SLIS is the oldest library school in the Philippines. Formally established in March 1961 as the Institute of Library Science, it can trace it roots to 1914, making it one of the first library schools in Asia. It is an independent degree-granting unit of the University of the Philippines Diliman, and offers programs in the field of library and information science. In December 2015, the Commission on Higher Education declared the school as the first and only Center of Excellence among  universities and colleges with library and information programs in the Philippines.

The School was formerly situated in Gonzalez Hall, where the UP Diliman Main Library is located. Constructed in the 1950s almost simultaneously with the arts and sciences, administration and engineering buildings, the Main Library was one of the first structures in the Diliman campus, designed by Juan Nakpil, the campus architect of that time. The building was later named Gonzalez Hall, in honor of the former UP President Bienvenido M. Gonzalez. It was purposely fashioned after the administration building, now known as Quezon Hall, just like how the arts and letters and engineering buildings were mirror images of each other.

UP SLIS was situated in the South Wing on the 3rd Floor of the Gonzalez Hall, University of the Philippines Diliman, Quezon City. In May 2019, the School started vacating Gonzalez Hall. The School currently has its own building on Quirino Avenue, the old Zoology Building which was formerly occupied by the Institute of Biology.

Academics
Starting in 1995, the School offered the Bachelor of Library and Information Science. The program aims to prepare students for career opportunities in professional librarianship, publishing and book trade, and information-related business. This program replaced the Bachelor of Library Science. A new curriculum introduced in 2002 integrated the University's Revised General Education Program and offered several specialization tracks, including archives and records management, health and medical librarianship, information systems, and law librarianship. Since 1962, the then Institute has offered a Master of Library Science program, the first in the country, and has since been updated to Master of Library and Information Science.

The School also commenced offering its Master of Archives and Records Management this AY 2022-2023.

Degree programs
Bachelor of Library and Information Science
Master of Library and Information ScienceBLIS and MLIS specialization tracks:
Information Systems and Technology
Archives and Records Management
Medical Librarianship
Law Librarianship
General Librarianship
Master of Archives and Records Management
Diploma in LibrarianshipDiploma program concentration areas:
Medical Sciences Librarianship
Law Librarianship

History
The school can trace its roots back to 1914, thirty years after Melvil Dewey established the first School of Library Economy in Columbia College. Library courses were offered in the College of Liberal Arts under James Alexander Robertson, UP's first library science professor. This made the University the first library school in the Philippines and one of the first in Asia. The first full library studies program was offered two years later, in 1916.

In March 1961, the Institute of Library Science was formally established, and a year later, the institute established its graduate program. From 1978 to 1984, the Institute was selected by UNESCO as the host institution for the Postgraduate Training Course for Science Information Specialists in Southeast Asia. In 2002, the Institute was renamed "Institute of Library and Information Science" in order to keep up with the nomenclature for the field. This required the institute to set up the first IT Applications Lab and Computer Lab for a library school in the Philippines. On March 27, 2007, the Board of Regents approved the Institute's petition to rename itself as the School of Library and Information Studies.

Limited space requirements and dilapidated conditions of the prior location of the UP SLIS on the third floor of the Gonzalez Hall prompted the School to launch a building fund to raise funds for the construction or renovation of a building for the transfer of its physical facilities in April 2007. Currently, it has reserved the Institute of Biology building as the future site for any such transfer. The building was chosen due to its proximity to the Main Library, which serves as the laboratory for its students.

Graduates from the school consistently top and register the highest passing rates (93% passing rate out of the 30% National Average in 2005, 95% in 2006 and 98% in 2007, 85% in 2008, 96% in 2009 and 97% in 2010) in the Licensure Examination for Librarians. From 2014 up to the present, UP SLIS has been a top-performing school, achieving a 100% passing rate in the said examinations.

UP SLIS Performance in the Librarian Licensure Examination, 2014-2022

Heads
Heads of the UP School of Library and Information Studies

Faculty of Instruction
The UP SLIS is the only LIS school in the country with a full-time faculty complement. It has 14 full-time faculty members. The school is also supported by 26 part-time lecturers.

Publications
The UP SLIS publishes the Philippine Journal of Librarianship and Information Studies (formerly the Journal of Philippine Librarianship), the only academic journal in the area of library and information science in the country. Aside from scholastic and thematic articles, it also publishes abstracts to graduate and undergraduate theses submitted to the school. In 2008, it started limited publication of its print version and has since been made available through the University of the Philippines Diliman Journals Online portal.

The School also publishes the information sheet SLIS Newsletter (available online through the official website) and its library produces guides, updates and current awareness services.

Organizations
UP Archons
UP Bibliotech
UP Future Library and Information Professionals of the Philippines
UP Library and Information Science Students Association
UP Library Science Alumni Association
UP School of Library and Information Studies Chorale
UP School of Library and Information Studies Student Council

Notes

External links

UP School of Library and Information Studies
UP School of Library and Information Studies Library
Philippine Journal of Librarianship and Information Studies

Library and Information Studies
Information schools
Educational institutions established in 1961
1961 establishments in the Philippines